"Tell Me About It" is a song written by Bill LaBounty and Pat McLaughlin, and recorded by American country music artist Tanya Tucker and singer-songwriter Delbert McClinton as a duet.  It was released in April 1993 as the third single from Tucker's album Can't Run from Yourself.  The song reached #4 on the Billboard Hot Country Singles & Tracks chart.

Chart performance

Year-end charts

References

1993 singles
1992 songs
Tanya Tucker songs
Songs written by Bill LaBounty
Songs written by Pat McLaughlin
Delbert McClinton songs
Male–female vocal duets
Liberty Records singles
Song recordings produced by Jerry Crutchfield